Holidate is a 2020 American romantic comedy film directed by John Whitesell, from a screenplay by Tiffany Paulsen. It stars Emma Roberts, Luke Bracey, Jake Manley, Jessica Capshaw, Andrew Bachelor, Frances Fisher, Manish Dayal and Kristin Chenoweth. The film was released on Netflix on October 28, 2020.

Plot
Sloane Benson is a young woman who hates the holidays due to the judgement she receives from her family for being single. Having recently broken up with her boyfriend, her mother Elaine is constantly trying to set her up with a new man, much to Sloane's annoyance. At her family's Christmas dinner her younger brother, York gets engaged to his girlfriend of three months, Liz, and Sloane is now the only single person left in the family. Meanwhile, Jackson, an Australian golfer, is stuck spending the holidays with a woman he has no interest in. His date becomes angry with him for not getting her a Christmas present, and he leaves in frustration.

After Christmas, Sloane and Jackson have a chance encounter when both are returning presents they received. Jackson offers to avoid bad holiday dates by dating only on holidays. Though initially reluctant, she decides to take Jackson up on his offer and the two end up spending New Year's Eve together, but have no further contact. However, on Valentine's Day, both have another chance encounter where Jackson pretends to be her boyfriend in front of her ex. They become friends over spending various holidays together.

After both become closer when Jackson loses a finger, he fears he is not good enough for her and tries to set her up with a better date, which leads to a fight at her brother‘s wedding. While at a Halloween costume party together, Sloane becomes unwell after accidentally swallowing laxatives. Jackson takes care of her until they end up falling asleep and having sex the morning after. Sloane's sister arrives freaking out about kissing somebody else and Sloane uses it as an excuse to shove Jackson out, much to his dismay.

At Thanksgiving, both have a fight after Jackson opens up to Sloane and tells her how he feels about them. In the store when Sloane says "Ryan Gosling would never do his own shopping" there is a blurred customer in the background who looks like the actor.

Both break off contact afterwards. In the days leading to Christmas, Sloane visits Jackson's place but she is still reluctant to speak to him. When shopping at the mall, they have another chance encounter. In front of hundreds of people, she confesses her love for Jackson and the two embrace. 

The end credits reveal that all of the couples were still together. With Sloane and Jackson travelling to Australia for the holidays, Aunt Susan being engaged to Farooq, Wally and Sloane’s mother dating, just like Neil and Carly (Jackson's date from the beginning of the film).

Cast
 Emma Roberts as Sloane Benson 
 Luke Bracey as Jackson
 Andrew Bachelor as Neil
 Jessica Capshaw as Abby
 Manish Dayal as Faarooq
 Alex Moffat as Peter
 Jake Manley as York
 Cynthy Wu as Liz
 Frances Fisher as Elaine
 Kristin Chenoweth as Aunt Susan
 Dan Lauria as Wally
 Carl McDowell as Scruffy Santa
 Nicola Peltz as Felicity
 Julien Marlon as Luc
 Mikaela Hoover as Annie
 Aimee Carrero as Carly
 Meeghan Holaway as Carly's Mom
 Savannah Reina as Daisy
 Billy Slaughter as Barry
 Carlos Lacamara as Carly's Dad

Production
In March 2019, it was announced Emma Roberts had joined the cast of the film, with John Whitesell directing from a screenplay by Tiffany Paulsen. McG and Mary Viola would serve as producers on the film under their Wonderland Sound and Vision banner, while Netflix would distribute. In May 2019, Luke Bracey, Jake Manley, Jessica Capshaw, Andrew Bachelor, Frances Fisher, Manish Dayal and Kristin Chenoweth joined the cast of the film. In June 2019, Alex Moffat joined the cast of the film.

Filming
Principal photography began in May 2019 in Atlanta, Georgia.

Music
The film's original score was composed by Dan the Automator.

Release
Holidate was digitally released by Netflix on October 28, 2020. It was the top-streamed item in its debut weekend. On November 4, Variety reported the film was the 25th-most watched straight-to-streaming title of 2020 up to that point. In January 2021, Netflix reported 68 million households had watched the film.

Reception
The website's critics consensus reads, "Holidate self-aware approach to rom-com formula is refreshing, but it's offset by a questionable premise and unnecessarily vulgar jokes." On Metacritic, it has a weighted average score of 44 out of 100, based on 15 critics, indicating "mixed or average reviews".

See also
 List of Christmas films

References

External links
 
 

2020 films
2020 romantic comedy films
2020s Christmas comedy films
American Christmas comedy films
American romantic comedy films
English-language Netflix original films
Films directed by John Whitesell
Films shot in Atlanta
Wonderland Sound and Vision films
Independence Day (United States) films
Saint Patrick's Day films
Thanksgiving in films
Films about Easter
American films about Halloween
Valentine's Day in films
2020s English-language films
2020s American films